I-175 may refer to:

 Interstate 175, an Interstate highway in Florida
 Interstate 175 (Georgia), a cancelled Interstate highway
 Interstate 175 (Kentucky-Tennessee), a proposed Interstate highway
 Japanese submarine I-175, a submarine operated by the Imperial Japanese Navy